The Paperboy is a 2012 American crime drama film co-written and directed by Lee Daniels and based on Pete Dexter's 1995 novel of the same name. The novel was inspired by a true story. It follows Miami reporter Ward Jansen who returns to his hometown in Florida to investigate a murder case involving a death row inmate. The film stars Matthew McConaughey, Zac Efron, Nicole Kidman, David Oyelowo, John Cusack and Macy Gray.

The film was produced by Daniels, Hilary Shor, Avi Lerner, Ed Cathell III, and Cassian Elwes. It premiered at the 2012 Cannes Film Festival on May 24, 2012 and October 5, 2012 worldwide. It grossed $102,706 in its opening weekend and $3.8 million worldwide, against a budget of $12.5 million, making it a box office bomb. Despite its mixed reviews, Kidman's performance drew Golden Globe and Screen Actors Guild Award nominations.

Plot
Anita (Macy Gray), the former maid of the Jansen family, recounts the events of the summer of 1969 when Ward Jansen (Matthew McConaughey), an idealistic reporter, returned to his hometown of Lately, Florida, to investigate the events surrounding the 1965 murder of a violent local sheriff. Hillary Van Wetter (John Cusack), a swamp-dwelling alligator hunter and small-time criminal, is on death row for the murder. Ward and his colleague, Englishman Yardley Acheman (David Oyelowo), investigative reporters with The Miami Times, plan to help exonerate him. Some evidence against Van Wetter was "lost", which Ward and Yardley plan to expose as redneck injustice.

Alabamian Charlotte Bless (Nicole Kidman) had fallen in love with Van Wetter, though they have not met, only exchanging correspondence. She arrives in Lately, determined to prove his innocence so they could marry. Charlotte requested the help of Ward and Yardley who then hired Jack (Zac Efron), Ward's younger brother, as their driver.

Ward has mixed feelings about returning home to his estranged father, W.W. (Scott Glenn), who runs Lately's local newspaper. The brothers dislike their divorced father's latest girlfriend, Ellen (Nealla Gordon). Jack works as a paperboy for his father's business after having been expelled from college, ending his collegiate swimming career. His only real friend is Anita, who helped 
Ward raise him after their mother left.
	
Jack proclaims his love to Charlotte, giving her his mother’s  ring, but she repeats that she is devoted to Van Wetter.

Van Wetter is initially hostile to the reporters. Contrary to the romantic portrayal he had painted of himself in his letters to Charlotte, he reveals himself to be racist, sexist, and crude. After Van Wetter tells them his alibi, the Jansens travel to meet Van Wetter's Uncle Tyree (Ned Bellamy). Tyree, who lives in pitiful conditions in the middle of the swamp, is initially reluctant to admit his own crime to save his nephew's life, but finally admits that they were away the night of the murder, stealing sod from a golf course in Ormond Beach.

Yardley and Charlotte visit the golf course to verify the story. Yardley claims to have found the developer who bought the stolen sod, saying that the man requested anonymity, so refuses to disclose his name even to Ward. Yardley goes back to Miami to start writing the article.

Suspicious of Yardley's motives, Ward decides to check Ormond Beach himself, with Jack and Charlotte in tow. On the way Ward gets drunk at a bar and approaches a black man. During the night, Charlotte and Jack hear alarming sounds and run from their rooms. They find the black man, with several others, viciously beating Ward. Ward is admitted to hospital.

Jack goes to Miami, hoping to convince Yardley not to publish the unproven "facts" with Ward’s name as co-reporter. During the confrontation, Yardley reveals he's actually an American pretending to be English to escape discrimination. He also reveals he had given Ward sexual favors in the past, which was the beginning of Ward's self-loathing infatuation with black men. Jack does not resent Ward for being a homosexual, but for keeping it a secret from him.

The article is published and Yardley leaves for New York with a book deal. Van Wetter obtains a pardon, and Charlotte goes to live with him in the swamp. Months later she is unhappy with his abusive behavior and sends a letter to Jack telling him she made a mistake and plans to reunite with him at his father's wedding. Jack does not receive the letter until the wedding reception, smuggled to him by Anita, who was fired from the Jansen household and knew that Ellen did not intend to pass the letter to Jack.

Charlotte is not at the wedding. Jack leaves to rescue her, joined by Ward, who has revealed that the anonymous developer does not exist, undercutting Van Wetter's alibi. Jack and Ward find that Van Wetter has killed Charlotte rather than let her attend the wedding. A fight ensues and Van Wetter kills Ward, while Jack dives into the swamp and evades him all night. The next morning he retrieves his loved ones’ bodies and boats away.

Anita concludes by recounting that Van Wetter was convicted for the murders of Ward and Charlotte and sent to the electric chair. Jack later saw his mother at Ward's funeral. He would never get over Charlotte.

Cast

Production
After the critical acclaim for his previous film Precious, Daniels was sent many possible scripts for a follow up including several lucrative offers. However he decided to pass on these stating  that "I couldn’t get off on it" and stating that he instead "went with what my spirit told me to do". Daniels had stated that along with Push, he viewed The Paperboy as "one of the great, great novels". He particularly enjoyed the characters in the novel, finding them extremely relatable, though he found the plot was somewhat nonsensical and thus viewed the movie as an attempt to create a more coherent storyline.

Daniels was initially nervous about meeting Kidman although he calmed down once she told him "I'm just a working girl, Lee. You've got to direct me." Kidman herself was unsure if she could portray her character, only gaining confidence after Daniels introduced her to several women who, similar to Kidman's character, had romantic involvements with prisoners, one of whom told her that she believed she could portray such a relationship convincingly. During the shoot Kidman only communicated to Cusack as her character, Charlotte, stating "I wanted to deal with him as the character and have him deal with me as the character". As a joke after filming wrapped, Cusack went up to Kidman and formally introduced himself. One notable scene featured Kidman urinating on Efron after he gets badly stung by a swarm of jellyfish. Although neither the actors involved nor Daniels had any problem with filming the scene, Daniels admitted to getting cold feet while editing and consulted with Kidman about possibly removing the scene who reportedly told him "Lee, you made me pee on Zac Efron. If you don't put it in the movie, you need to man up."

Release
The film premiered on the 65th Cannes Film Festival on May 28, 2012, to mixed reviews. Robbie Collin at The Daily Telegraph wrote that "Readers of the film's Wikipedia page may spot the claim that it received 'the longest sustained standing ovation of the festival at 16 minutes'. As someone who was present at that screening, and the cacophonous quarter-hour of jeering, squawking and mooing that followed, I think Wikipedia may want to clarify its definition of 'standing ovation'." The Guardian surmised, "those who prefer delicate watercolours had better stand well back. It makes a lurid splash." The Paperboy also screened at the 39th edition of the Flanders International Film Festival Ghent, 2012 Ischia Film Festival, 2012 New Orleans Film Festival, 50th New York Film Festival (to which Kidman received a tribute gala), 2012 Toronto International Film Festival, and the 2012 Stockholm International Film Festival.

Reception

Reception to The Paperboy has been mixed with some critics comparing it to Lee Daniels' directorial debut, Shadowboxer. Robbie Collin of The Daily Telegraph disliked the film at its Cannes premiere, but positively reappraised it almost a year later on its UK release. "As a piece of art this is all lust, no caution; a heady mirage of sex, swamps and soul music that wants nothing more than for you to share in the joke. Thank goodness I finally got it," he wrote. Most praise has been for Nicole Kidman's portrayal of Charlotte Bless, and Collin wrote that she "has not been this good since Dogville (2003), and...secretes sensuality like a slug does slime". Peter Bradshaw of The Guardian said, "Nicole Kidman really is terrifically good as Charlotte: funny, sexy, poignantly vulnerable". Sophia Pande of Nepali Times wrote, "The Paperboy may not be to your taste. It is often over the top and very violent, but this is Lee Daniel’s [sic] style. It is this very style backed by intelligence, undeniable directorial skill, and an intimate knowledge of his deeply flawed but very human characters that make for such a compelling film." Nonetheless, the Alliance of Women Film Journalists nominated Kidman in the category, "Actress Most in Need of a New Agent."

On  Rotten Tomatoes, the film holds an approval rating of 45% based on 147 reviews, with an average rating of 5.20/10. The website's critics consensus reads: "Trashy and melodramatic, The Paperboy is enlivened by a strong cast and a steamy, sordid plot, but it's uneven and often veers into camp." On Metacritic, the film has a weighted average score of 45 out of 100, based on 38 critics, indicating "mixed or average reviews".

The staff of The A.V. Club named it the worst film of 2012. The New Yorker film critic Michael Schulman called the film "deliriously tawdry and nonsensical". Stephen Whitty of the Newark Star-Ledger wrote of the film, "Simply ugly trash," while Mick LaSalle of the San Francisco Chronicle basically recommended one watch the movie "with the indispensable aid of that wonderful late-20th century invention: fast forward."

Soundtrack
Singer Mariah Carey wrote and recorded a song titled "Mesmerized" for the film's soundtrack. The song, however, was not released to coincide with the film. It was released on October 2, 2020 on her special collection of previously hard-to-find and unreleased songs, The Rarities. The song was produced by Carey along with Loris Holland and Randy Jackson.

Accolades

References

External links
 
 
 
 

2012 films
2012 thriller drama films
2012 LGBT-related films
American LGBT-related films
American thriller drama films
Films directed by Lee Daniels
Films about journalists
Films about race and ethnicity
Films about racism
Films about sexual repression
Films based on American novels
Films set in Florida
Films shot in Los Angeles
Films shot in New Orleans
Films set in 1969
Southern Gothic films
2012 drama films
Films scored by Mario Grigorov
2010s English-language films
Films produced by Avi Lerner
2010s American films